Colleter or Colléter may refer to:

 Colleter (botany) or Colletor, one of the mucilage-secreting hairs on certain plants
 Colleter (company), a company in France
 Patrick Colleter, a professional football player
 Solenn Colléter, a French novelist